Golding is a surname of English origin.

Golding may also refer to:

Places
 Golding Island, one of the Falkland Islands

People
 Golding for a list of people by this surname
 Golding baronets, a family of baronets in England
 Golding Bird (1814–1854), British medical doctor

Other uses
 Goldings, a variety of hop
 Golding Contractors, Australian construction company

See also
 Gilding, the application of fine gold leaf or powder to solid surfaces
 Gold (disambiguation)
 Golden (disambiguation)
 Goldin, a Jewish surname
 Goulding (disambiguation)